Orlev is a Hebrew surname. Notable people with the surname include:

Uri Orlev (born 1931), Israeli children's author and translator
Zevulun Orlev (born 1945), Israeli politician, Knesset member, and Welfare and Social Services Minister of Israel

Hebrew-language surnames